Rachel Avery is an American film and television actress known for appearances in Scrubs, HBO's Big Love and more recently Ben Stiller's Tropic Thunder.

Avery was born in Chicago, Illinois. She graduated from the UCLA School of Theater, Film and Television and currently resides in Los Angeles, California.

Filmography

References

External links

Rachel Avery Online - fanpage

Year of birth missing (living people)
Living people
Actresses from Chicago
Actresses from Los Angeles
American film actresses
UCLA Film School alumni
American television actresses
Actresses from Illinois
21st-century American women